Miaenia flavomaculata is a species of beetle in the family Cerambycidae. It was described by Fisher in 1925.

References

Miaenia
Beetles described in 1925